ECTR may refer to:

 European Council on Tolerance and Reconciliation
 endoscopic carpal tunnel release, a medical surgical procedure
 E-Center (E-Ctr) a multipurpose arena in West Valley City, Utah, USA
 E-Centre (E-Ctr) an amphitheater-theatre complex in Camden, New Jersey, USA